Nicolescu is a Romanian surname. Notable people with the surname include:

Alexandru Nicolescu, Greek-Catholic bishop
Basarab Nicolescu, theoretical physicist 
Constantin Nicolescu, general
Mariana Nicolescu, soprano
Miron Nicolescu, mathematician 
Gheorghe Constantin Nicolescu, literary historian
Tatiana Nicolescu, philologist and translator, professor

See also
Niculescu

Romanian-language surnames
Patronymic surnames
Surnames from given names